Sweden, as the hosting nation, sent as many as 74 athletes to the 2006 European Athletics Championships. The squad included three Olympic champions from Athens 2004, the heptathlete Carolina Klüft, the high jumper Stefan Holm and the triple jumper Christian Olsson.

Results

List of Swedish results, where Athletes reached the Final in that event. (Heats/Quarter-Finals/Semi-Final scores will not be recorded)

Competitors

References

Nations at the 2006 European Athletics Championships
European Championships in Athletics
Sweden at the European Athletics Championships